St. Vincent's Church may refer to:

Denmark
 St. Vincent's Church, Helsingør

Portugal

 Monastery of São Vicente de Fora, Lisbon
 St Vincent's Church, Braga, Braga
 Igreja de São Vicente de Sousa, Felgueiras Municipality

England

 St Vincent's Church, Caythorpe, Lincolnshire, England
 St Vincent's Church, Crookes, South Yorkshire, England
 St Vincent's Church, Sheffield, South Yorkshire, England
 Church of St Vincent, Ashington, Somerset, England

Poland

 Church of St. Vincent (Wrocław), Poland

See also 
 St. Vincent de Paul Church (disambiguation)
 St. Vincent Ferrer Catholic Church (disambiguation)